"Johnny Carson" is a song by American rock band the Beach Boys from their 1977 album The Beach Boys Love You. It was written by Brian Wilson as a tribute to one of his idols, Johnny Carson. The recording features Mike Love on lead vocals, accompanied by an arrangement of synthesizers, organ, and piano.

Inspiration

"Johnny Carson" expresses admiration for the host of the late-night television talk show, The Tonight Show Starring Johnny Carson, and extols his ability to be a consistent entertainer. In 1977, Wilson wrote of the origins for the song:

Conversely, in a later interview, Wilson explained that he wrote the song after overhearing another person in the room talk about Carson. "I told them I was gonna write a song about him and they didn't believe me. I had the whole thing done in twenty minutes."

Wilson's 1991 memoir, Wouldn't It Be Nice: My Own Story, credits the impetus for the song to his psychologist, Eugene Landy. It states that Landy suggested and helped Wilson write a song about Carson in order for Wilson to overcome his fear of appearing on The Tonight Show.

Reception
Biographer Peter Ames Carlin referred to the track as the album's "pivot point", one that "separates the normal from the freakishly bizarre."

Asked about the song in a 1979 interview, Carson answered, "Sure I heard it. Someone sent it over to the office. I don't think it was a big seller. I think they just did it for the fun of it. It was not a work of art."

See also
 "Brian Wilson" (song)

References

1977 songs
The Beach Boys songs
Songs written by Brian Wilson
Song recordings produced by Brian Wilson
Songs based on actual events
Songs about comedians